Dizaj-e Takyeh (also Romanized as Dīzaj-e Takyeh) is a village in Baranduzchay-ye Shomali Rural District, in the Central District of Urmia County, West Azerbaijan Province, Iran. At the 2006 census, its population was 737, in 204 families.
The village was largely inhabited by Assyrians until the Assyrian genocide. The Assyrian church of Raban-Hormoz is located within the village.

References 

Populated places in Urmia County